The 2010 NSC Minnesota Stars season was the first season of the franchise to be played in the USSF Division 2 Pro League.

Roster

Staff

Transfers

In

Released

Friendlies

Competitions

USSF Division 2

Standings

Results summary

Results

Playoffs

U.S. Open Cup

NSC Minnesota Stars entered the 2010 edition of the Open Cup at the First Round stage, defeating KC Athletics before being knocked out in the Second Round by AC St. Louis.

Squad statistics

Appearances and goals

|-
|colspan="14"|Players who left NSC Minnesota Stars during the season:

|-
|}

Goal scorers

Disciplinary record

References

External links

2010
American soccer clubs 2010 season
USSF Division 2 Professional League
NSC Minnesota